Aaron Lavarias (born April 27, 1988), is a professional Canadian football defensive end for the Montreal Alouettes of the Canadian Football League. He has previously played for the New England Patriots.

College career
He played college football at University of Idaho.

Professional career

New England Patriots
On July 27, 2011, he signed as an undrafted free agent. On September 3, 2011, he was released. On September 5, 2011, he was signed to the Patriots practice squad. On September 14, 2011, he was released. On December 28, 2011, he was signed to the practice squad.  On February 7, 2012, he signed a future contract with the team.
Lavarias was released by the Patriots on August 31, 2012 during final cuts.

Montreal Alouettes
On October 3, 2012 Lavarias signed with the Montreal Alouettes of the CFL. In his first two seasons, he has recorded 78 tackles with 11 sacks and 1 fumble recovery. On January 2, 2015 Lavarias re-signed a 2-year contract with the Montreal Alouettes.

References

External links 
 New England Patriots profile
 Montreal Alouettes bio 

1988 births
American football defensive ends
Canadian football defensive linemen
American players of Canadian football
New England Patriots players
Players of American football from Washington (state)
People from Woodinville, Washington
Living people
Idaho Vandals football players
Montreal Alouettes players